Talparia is a genus of sea snails, marine gastropod mollusks in the subfamily Luriinae of the family Cypraeidae, the cowries.

Species
Species within the genus Talparia include:
 Talparia exusta (Sowerby, 1832)
 Talparia talpa (Linnaeus, 1758)
Synonyms
 Talparia argus (Linnaeus, 1758): synonym of Arestorides argus  (Linnaeus, 1758)
 Talparia mariaelisabethae Dolin, 1991: synonym of † Lyncina mariaelisabethae (Dolin, 1991)  (original combination)

References

External links
 Sheffield Airey. (1939-1996). Nomenclator Zoologicus vol. 1-10 Online

Cypraeidae